The Kent League was a football league which existed from 1894 until 1959, based in the English county of Kent.  Another, unrelated, Kent League was formed in 1966, and is now known as the Southern Counties East Football League.

Champions
The champions of the league's top division were as follows:

Member clubs
During the league's history, member clubs included:

12th Infantry Training Corps
1st King's Own
1st Royal Warwickshire
1st South Wales Borderers
2nd Connaught Rangers
2nd Essex Regiment
2nd King's Royal Rifles
2nd Lancashire Fusiliers
2nd Royal Dublin Fusiliers
2nd Royal Irish Rifles
3rd Worcestershire
Army Ordnance Corps (Woolwich)
Army Service Corps (Grove Park)
Ashford Railway Works
Ashford Railway Works Reserves
Ashford Town
Ashford Town Reserves
Ashford United
Aveling & Porter (Strood)
Aylesford Paper Mills
Aylesford Paper Mills Reserves
Belvedere & District
Betteshanger Colliery Welfare
Betteshanger Colliery Welfare Reserves
Bexleyheath & Welling
Bexleyheath & Welling Reserves
Bexleyheath Labour
Bexleyheath Town
Borstal
Bowaters Lloyd
Bowaters Lloyd Reserves
Bromley
Canterbury City
Canterbury City Reserves
Canterbury Waverley
Canterbury Waverley Reserves
Carabiners
Catford Southend
Charlton Athletic
Charlton Athletic 'A'
Charlton Athletic Reserves
Chatham Town
Chatham Town Reserves
Chislet Colliery Welfare
Cray Wanderers
Cray Wanderers Reserves
Crystal Palace Reserves
Dartford
Dartford Reserves
Dartford Amateurs
Deal Cinque Ports
Deal Town
Deal Town Reserves
Depot Battalion, RE
Depot Machine Gun Corps (Folkestone)
Depot Royal West Kent Regiment
Deptford Invicta
Deptford Town
Dover
Dover Reserves
Dover United
Erith
Erith & Belvedere
Erith Oil Works
Eythorne
Faversham Services
Faversham Town
Faversham Town Reserves
Folkestone
Folkestone Reserves
Folkestone Gas
Folkestone Harveians
Folkestone Town
Folkestone Town Reserves
Gillingham
Gillingham 'A'
Gillingham Reserves
Gravesend & Northfleet Reserves
Gravesend Hotspur
Gravesend United
Grays Athletic
Grays Thurrock United
Grays Thurrock United Reserves
Herne Bay
Herne Bay Reserves
Lloyds Paper Mills
Lloyds Paper Mills Reserves
London Paper Mills
Loyal Regiment
Luton
Maidstone Athletic
Maidstone Church Institute
Maidstone Institute
Maidstone Invicta
Maidstone United
Maidstone United Reserves
Margate
Margate Reserves
Medway Corrugated Paper Company
Metrogas
Millwall Reserves
Minster United
Murston Rangers
New Brompton
New Brompton Amateurs
New Brompton Excelsior
Northfleet
Northfleet United
Orpington
RAF Eastchurch
Rainham
Ramsgate
Ramsgate Reserves
Ramsgate Athletic
Ramsgate Athletic Reserves
Ramsgate Grenville
Ramsgate Press Wanderers
Ramsgate Town
RETB Chatham
Rochester
Rochester & Borstal
Royal Artillery
Royal Marines (Chatham)
Royal Marines (Chatham) Reserves
Royal Marines (Deal)
Royal Marines (Deal) Reserves
Royal Naval Depot (Chatham)
Royal Naval Depot (Chatham) Reserves
Royal Ordnance Factories
Royal Scots Fusiliers
Royal West Kent Regiment
S.E. Railway Mechanics Institute
S.R. Athletic
Sevenoaks
Sheppey United
Sheppey United Reserves
Shorts Sports
Sittingbourne
Sittingbourne Reserves
Snodland Town
Snowdown Colliery Welfare
Snowdown Colliery Welfare Reserves
South Lancashire Regiment
Southend United Reserves
Strood
Swanscombe
Tilbury
Tonbridge
Troy Town Invicta
Tunbridge Wells United
Tunbridge Wells United Reserves
Vickers (Crayford)
Vickers (Erith)
Whitstable
Whitstable Reserves
Woolwich
Woolwich Reserves
Woolwich Arsenal Reserves

References

 
1
1894 establishments in England
Sports leagues established in 1894